Bernie Leadon is an American musician and songwriter. In addition to his solo album and recordings with Eagles, Hearts & Flowers, Dillard & Clark, and the Flying Burrito Brothers, he has been featured as a performer and composer on many albums by other artists.

Solo recordings
 2004: Mirror (Really Small Entertainment)

As a member of The Maundy Quintet
 1967: "2's Better Than 3" / "I'm Not Alone" (Paris Tower)

As a member of Hearts & Flowers
 1968: Of Horses, Kids and Forgotten Women (Capitol)

As a member of Dillard & Clark
 1968: The Fantastic Expedition of Dillard & Clark (A&M)
 1969: Through the Morning, Through the Night (A&M)

As a member of Linda Ronstadt & The Corvettes
 1969: Music from Free Creek (Charisma) - released in 1973

As a member of The Flying Burrito Brothers
 1970: Burrito Deluxe (A&M)
 1970: Sleepless Nights (A&M) - released in 1976
 1971: The Flying Burrito Bros (A&M)
 1971: Devils in Disguise: 1971 Live Radio Broadcast (Smokin' / Let Them Eat Vinyl) - released in 2012

As a member of Eagles
 1972: Eagles - (Asylum)
 1973: Desperado (Asylum)
 1974: On the Border (Asylum)
 1975: One of These Nights (Asylum)

With Chris Hillman, David Mansfield, Al Perkins, and Jerry Scheff
 1985: Ever Call Ready (Maranatha! / A&M)

With Michael Georgiades
 1977: The Bernie Leadon-Michael Georgiades Band - Natural Progressions (Asylum)

As composer

1967 - 1979
 1967: The Maundy Quintet - "2's Better Than 3" and "I'm Not Alone"
 1968: Hearts & Flowers - Of Horses - Kids - and Forgotten Women (Capitol) - track 6, "When I Was A Cowboy"; track 7, "Legend of Ol' Tenbrookes"; track 9, "Two Little Boys" (all co-written with Dave Dawson and Larry Murray); and track 10, "Extra, Extra / Rock And Roll Gypsies / Extra Extra" (co-written with Larry Murray and Roger Tillison)
 1970: Douglas Dillard - The Banjo Album (Together) - track 11, "With Care From Someone" (co-written with Doug Dillard and Gene Clark)
 1971: Linda Ronstadt - Silk Purse (Capitol) - track 9, "He Darked The Sun" (co-written with Gene Clark)
 1972: Johnny Rivers - L.A. Reggae (United Artists) - track 11, "Life Is A Game" (co-written with Michael Georgiades)
 1972: Johnny "Hammond" Smith - The Prophet (Kudu) - track 3, "Witchy Woman" (co-written with Don Henley)
 1974: Gene Clark - No Other (Asylum) - track 9, "Train Leaves Here This Morning" (bonus track from 2003 reissue)
 1976: Barbara Dickson - Answer Me (RSO - track 3, "My Man"
 1977: New Grass Revival - New Grass Revival (Starday) - track 8, "With Care From Someone" (co-written with Doug Dillard and Gene Clark)
 1979: Douglas Adams - The Hitch-Hiker's Guide To The Galaxy (Original) - track A1, "Journey Of The Sorcerer"; track D8, "Journey's End (Journey Of The Sorcerer)"
 1979: New Grass Revival - Barren County (Flying Fish) - track 2, "In The Plan" (co-written with Doug Dillard and Gene Clark)

1980 - 1999
 1986: J. D. Crowe and the New South - Straight Ahead (Rounder) - track 2, "God's Own Singer"
 1990: The Skeletons - In The Flesh (Demon / East Side Digital) - track 2, "Older Guys" (co-written with Chris Hillman and Gram Parsons)
 1991: Devonsquare - Bye Bye Route 66 (Atlantic) - track 5, "Diamond Days" (co-written with Tom Dean)
 1992: Joy Lynn White - Between Midnight & Hindsight (Columbia) - track 9, "Hey Hey Mama" (co-written with Jimmy Davis)
 1992: Restless Heart - Big Iron Horses (RCA) - track 7, "Blame It On Love" (co-written with Jimmy Davis and Tommy Burroughs)
 1994: New Grass Revival - Today's Bluegrass (Hollywood / IMG) - track 10, "With Care from Someone" (co-written with Doug Dillard and Gene Clark)
 1996: Crystal Bernard - Girl Next Door (River North / A&M) - track 8, "Too Far This Time" (co-written with David Rhyne and Vaughan Penn)
 1996: Union Springs - Next Train Headed South (Copper Creek) - track 9, "God's Own Singer"
 1996: Still Going West - 727 (Road) - track 8, "Twenty-One"

2000 - present
 2000: J. P. Fraley - Wild Rose of the Mountain (Rounder) - track 31, "Bitter Creek"
 2000: Jetenderpaul - Presents the Modal Lines (Burnt Toast Vinyl) - track 13, "Twenty-One"
 2000: various artists - Full Circle: A Tribute to Gene Clark (Not Lame) - track 2-6, "Train Leaves Here This Morning" (co-written with Gene Clark)
 2003: Last Train Home - Tributaries (Adult Swim) - track 1, "Train Leaves Here This Morning" (co-written with Gene Clark)
 2008: Daryl Braithwaite - The Lemon Tree (Liberation Music) - track 9, "My Man"
 2009: Jussi Syren - From Vyborg to L.A. (Goofin') - track 9, "God's Own Singer"
 2016: John McEuen - Made in Brooklyn (Chesky) - track 4, "She Darked the Sun" (co-written with Gene Clark)

As producer
 1975: David Bromberg - Midnight On The Water (Columbia)
 1998: Tiny Town - Tiny Town (Atlantic / Pioneer)
 1998: Full on the Mouth - Collide (Atlantic)
 1998: CeCe Winans - Everlasting Love (Atlantic / Pioneer) - executive producer 
 2001: Judson Spence - I Guess I Love It (Pioneer)
 2001: Full on the Mouth - People Mover (Pioneer)

Also appears on

1968 - 1974
 1968: Nitty Gritty Dirt Band - Rare Junk (Liberty Records) - guitar
 1968: Mary McCaslin - Rain: The Lost Album (Bear Family, released in 1999) - guitar
 1969: Buzz Clifford - See Your Way Clear (Dot) - resonator guitar
 1970: Bob Gibson - Bob Gibson (Capitol) - guitar 
 1970: Douglas Dillard - The Banjo Album (Together) - guitar
 1970: Hedge & Donna Capers - Special Circumstances (Capitol) - resonator guitar, acoustic guitar
 1971: Barry McGuire and the Doctor (Eric Hord) - Barry McGuire & The Doctor (A&M) - guitar
 1971: Bob Lind - Since There Were Circles (Capitol) - lead guitar
 1971: Linda Ronstadt - Linda Ronstadt - guitar, backing vocals
 1971: Paul Siebel - Jack-Knife Gypsy (Elektra) - guitar
 1972: Rita Coolidge - The Lady's Not for Sale (A&M) - guitar
 1972: Rick Roberts - Windmills (A&M) - vocals, guitar, banjo
 1973:  Gene Clark - Roadmaster (Ariola Records) Electric Guitar on 3 - Here Tonight
 1973: Gram Parsons - Sleepless Nights (A&M, released in 1976) - acoustic guitar
 1974: Gram Parsons - Grievous Angel (Reprise) - guitar (acoustic, electric, resonator)
 1974: Randy Newman - Good Old Boys (Reprise) - vocals

1975 - 1979
 1975: Andy Fairweather Low - La Booga Rooga (A&M) - banjo, guitar
 1975: Emmylou Harris - Pieces of the Sky (Reprise) - banjo, resonator guitar, acoustic guitar, bass, vocals
 1975: Emmylou Harris - Elite Hotel (Reprise) - acoustic guitar, vocals
 1975: Danny O'Keefe - So Long Harry Truman (Atlantic) - vocals
 1976: Chris Hillman - Slippin' Away (Asylum) - guitar, vocals on track 10, "(Take Me In Your) Lifeboat"
 1976: Andy Fairweather Low - Be Bop 'N' Holla (A&M) - guitar (acoustic, electric)
 1976: David Bromberg - How Late'll Ya Play 'Til? (Fantasy) - guitar
 1977: Helen Reddy - Ear Candy (Capitol) - vocals
 1978: various artists - White Mansions (A Tale From The American Civil War 1861-1865) (A&M) - guitar (acoustic, electric, resonator), banjo, mandolin, pedal steel, vocals

1980 - 1984
 1980: various artists - The Legend of Jesse James (A&M) - guitar, banjo
 1981: Chi Coltrane - Silk & Steel (CBS) - acoustic guitar
 1982: Teresa Brewer - In London (Signature) - track 7, "Saturday Night" (co-written with Don Henley, Glenn Frey, and Randy Meisner)
 1982: Chris Hillman - Morning Sky (Sugar Hill Records) - banjo on track 2, "The Taker"
 1982: Harry Browning and Laury Boone - Sweet Harmony (Lamb & Lion) - banjo
 1984: Chris Hillman - Desert Rose (Sugar Hill) - vocals, guitar (acoustic, electric), banjo, mandora, fiddle
 1984: Stephen Stills - Right by You (Atlantic) - guitar, vocals

1985 - 1989
 1987: Bobby Durham - Where I Grew Up (HighTone) - guitar
 1987: Helen Watson - Blue Slipper (Hit Or Miss) - guitar 
 1988: Bob Neuwirth - Back To The Front (Gold Castle Records) - resonator guitar, banjo, mandolin 
 1988: John Hiatt - Slow Turning (A&M) - mandocello, guitar
 1988: various artists - Way Down Deep In My Soul (Sugar Hill) - banjo, vocals on track 9, "Turn Your Radio On"
 1989: Alabama - Southern Star (RCA) - acoustic guitar, banjo, mandolin
 1989: Green On Red - This Time Around (Off-Beat Records) - mandolin 
 1989: Helen Watson - The Weather Inside (Hit Or Miss) - mandolin on track 8, "Dangerous Daybreak"
 1989: Nanci Griffith - Storms (MCA) - guitar (acoustic, electric)
 1989: Nitty Gritty Dirt Band - Will the Circle Be Unbroken: Volume Two (Universal) - banjo

1990 - 1993
 1990: Alabama - Pass It On Down (BMG) - acoustic guitar, banjo
 1990: Kenny Rogers - Love Is Strange (Reprise) - acoustic guitar, mandola, mandolin
 1990: Matraca Berg - Lying to the Moon (RCA) - guitar, banjo
 1991: Bashung - Osez Joséphine (Barclay) - guitar (acoustic, electric), mandolin
 1991: Hank Williams, Jr. - Pure Hank (Warner Bros.) - mandolin
 1991: Kelly Willis - Bang Bang (MCA) - guitar (acoustic, electric)
 1991: Marty Balin - Better Generation (GWE) - mandola
 1991: The Remingtons - Blue Frontier (RCA Victor) - acoustic guitar, tiple, banjo, mandolin
 1991: Travis Tritt - It's All About to Change (Warner Bros.) - guitar (acoustic, electric), mandocello, mandola
 1992: Alabama - American Pride (RCA Victor) - banjo, guitar, mandolin
 1992: Branson Brothers - Heartmender (Warner Bros.) - acoustic guitar, banjo, mandola, mandolin, mandora
 1992: Kathy Mattea - Lonesome Standard Time (Universal / Mercury) - guitar (acoustic, electric)
 1992: Robert Ellis Orrall - Flying Colors (RCA) - acoustic guitar 
 1992: Ronna Reeves - The More I Learn (Polygram / Mercury) - acoustic guitar, tiple
 1992: Ronna Reeves - What Comes Naturally (Mercury) - guitar, mandolin
 1992: Michelle Shocked - Arkansas Traveler (Mercury) - mandolin, guitar, banjo
 1992: Restless Heart - Big Iron Horses (RCA) - banjo
 1993: Alabama - Cheap Seats (RCA) - guitar, banjo
 1993: David Crosby - Thousand Roads (Atlantic) - guitar (acoustic, electric)
 1993: Patsy Moore - The Flower Child's Guide to Love & Fashion (Warner Alliance) - acoustic guitar, banjo
 1993: Mitch Malloy - Ceilings & Walls (RCA) - guitar
 1993: The Remingtons - Aim for the Heart (RCA / BNA) - acoustic guitar

1994 - 1999
 1994: Bob Woodruff - Dreams and Saturday Nights (Asylum / Elektra) - banjo 
 1994: Stevie Nicks - Street Angel (Modern) - backing vocals, cello, guitar, mandocello, mandolin
 1995: Freelight - Freelight (San Francisco Sound) - acoustic guitar, banjo 
 1995: Pam Tillis - All of This Love (Arista) - banjo
 1997: Amazing Rhythm Aces - Ride Again (Breaker) - guitar, banjo, mandolin
 1998: Linda Ronstadt - We Ran (Elektra) - guitar (acoustic, electric), mandocello, vocals
 1998: Mancy A'lan Kane - Paper Moon (Atlantic) - acoustic guitar
 1999: Linda Ronstadt and Emmylou Harris - Western Wall: The Tucson Sessions (Asylum) - guitar (acoustic, electric, 12-string), mandolin, bass, guitarron, mandocello

2000 - present
 2003: Emmylou Harris - Stumble into Grace (Nonesuch) - electric guitar
 2003: The Jayhawks - Rainy Day Music (American Recordings / Lost Highway) - banjo on track 2, "Tailspin"
 2014: John Cowan - Sixty (Compass) - banjo
 2015: Ethan Johns with the Black Eyed Dogs - Silver Liner (Three Crows / Caroline) - vocals

Sources
 
 
 

Discographies of American artists
Rock music discographies
Country music discographies
Folk music discographies